The Joseph Robbins House is a historic house located in the Osterville village of Barnstable, Massachusetts, USA.

Description and history 
The wood-frame Cape style house was built c. 1820-30 by Joseph Robbins, a painter who is also known for painting the figurehead of the USS Constitution. It is a rare local example of Federal styling, with a multi-pane transom window over the main entrance. The house is a -story structure, five bays wide, with a side gable roof and a central chimney.

The house was listed on the National Register of Historic Places on November 10, 1987.

See also
National Register of Historic Places listings in Barnstable County, Massachusetts

References

Houses completed in 1820
Houses in Barnstable, Massachusetts
National Register of Historic Places in Barnstable, Massachusetts
Houses on the National Register of Historic Places in Barnstable County, Massachusetts
Federal architecture in Massachusetts